Princess Ghida Talal (née Ghida Salaam; born 11 July 1963) is the chairperson of the board of trustees of the King Hussein Cancer Foundation and Center (KHCF) and (KHCC), based in Amman, Jordan. Born to a politically prominent family in Lebanon, Princess Ghida is married to Prince Talal bin Muhammad of Jordan, the nephew of King Hussein bin Talal and 41st-generation direct descendant of the Islamic prophet Muhammad.

Biography
Princess Ghida Talal was born 11 July 1963 in Beirut, Lebanon, to Hany Salam and Raja'a Arab. She is the eldest of four children. The Salam family is a politically prominent family in Lebanon. Her great-grandfather Salim Ali Salam was a leading political figure in Beirut at the turn of the 20th century and held numerous public positions, including deputy from Beirut to the Ottoman Parliament. Her great-uncle Saeb Salam served as Prime Minister of Lebanon several times. Ghida has 5 siblings, Nashad Talal-Mohamed, Omar Talal-Mohamed, Hamza Talal, Hema Talal-Afzal, Azad Talal-Mohamed.

Princess Ghida attended school in Beirut at the College Protestant Francais and graduated with the French and Lebanese baccalaureates. After finishing high school in Beirut, she began her college education in the United States. She graduated with a joint bachelor's and master's degree and magna cum laude honors in international politics and economics from Georgetown University's Edmund A. Walsh School of Foreign Service in Washington, D.C.

After university, she began a career in journalism, starting with a job as a researcher for the American Broadcasting Company (ABC) News in London. She then moved to Argentina as a correspondent for the London-based Sunday Times newspaper. She then moved back to Beirut, where she covered Lebanese politics for Reuters. Her last work as a journalist was with the Financial Times of London.

Princess Ghida moved to Jordan when she married Prince Talal Bin Muhammad in 1991. The late King Hussein asked her to establish the International Press Office of the Royal Hashemite Court and she became the King's Press Secretary. In that capacity, she oversaw all press activities for the King and led a team of writers and press officers who covered the King's official activities. Princess Ghida also directed research projects and produced many political and economic publications about Jordan. She served as Press Secretary until King Hussein's death in 1999.

In 2001, King Abdullah II appointed Princess Ghida as full-time chairperson of the board of trustees of the King Hussein Cancer Foundation. The King Hussein Cancer Center (KHCC) is one of the most prominent comprehensive cancer centers in the Middle East that treats both adult and pediatric patients. KHCC treats over 4000 new cancer patients each year from Jordan and the region. It is equipped with state-of-the- art medical equipment and services, including 8 operating rooms and 170 beds. It houses 18 intensive care units, including 6 ICU specialized for pediatric care.

Under Princess Ghida's leadership, KHCF entered into agreements and partnerships with the University of Texas MD Anderson Cancer Center, National Cancer Institute (NCI) of the National Institutes of Health (NIH), St. Jude Children's Research Hospital, Georgetown University's Lombardi Cancer Center and Susan G. Komen for the Cure.

Princess Ghida remained active in other pursuits. In 2007, she played a vital role in the Iraq Scholar Rescue Project, an Institute of International Education (IIE), which aimed to rescue scholars from Iraq who were being persecuted. Princess Ghida helped find them safe havens at host universities across Europe, the U.S. and the Middle East, in particular Jordan, until they were able to safely return to their home country. She was awarded IIE's Humanitarian Award for International Cooperation in 2008.

King Abdullah II appointed Princess Ghida to represent Jordan as his special envoy at the United Nations General Assembly's High Level Meeting on non-communicable diseases (NCDs), held September 2011 in New York.

On the occasion of Jordan's Independence Day, 25 May 2012, the King Hussein Cancer Center and Foundation received the Kingdom's Medal of Independence in recognition of its work in the fight against cancer and for providing life-saving treatment to cancer patients in Jordan and the region.

Princess Ghida has a public page on Facebook dedicated to raising awareness about the fight against cancer, and an account on Twitter.

Personal life
Ghida married Prince Talal bin Muhammad in 1991. The couple live in Jordan with their three children: Prince Hussein (born 1999) and twins Princess Raja'a and Prince Muhammad (born 2001).

Education

 1986 – Georgetown University (Washington, D.C.)
BSFS/MSFS five-year joint degree program Master of Science in foreign service, magna cum laude (high honors) Bachelor of Science in foreign service, magna cum laude (high honors) area of concentration: international politics and economics, national security studies

 1981 – College Protestant Francais (Beirut, Lebanon)

Career

In addition to posts discussed above:

Summer 1988 Reuters Ltd, Beirut, Lebanon correspondent
Reported on the fall of Burj al Barajneh refugee camp, car bombings, inter-Shiite fighting and the hostage crisis. Covered the 1989 Lebanese presidential elections. Wrote political articles, feature stories, news analyses and political profiles.

1987 – 1988 ABC News, London, UK researcher
Provided backup for correspondents and producers. Conducted interviews, covered press conferences, voiced over commentaries for news broadcasts and documentaries. Assisted in editing news stories.

Board memberships
From Feb 2013: Appointed to board of the Institute of International Education
From Oct. 2011: Georgetown University – Washington D.C. board of directors Master of Science in foreign service
Oct. 2003 – Oct. 2009:  Georgetown University – Washington D.C. board of regents
From 2007: Scholar Rescue Fund, Institute of International Education – New York
From Oct. 2005: National Gallery of Fine Arts – Amman, Jordan 
From Oct. 1997: National Swimming Federation – Jordan (honorary chairperson)

Titles, styles, honours and awards

Honours
National honours:
May 2012 – Independence Medal of the First Order, presented by HM King Abdullah II in recognition of the great work accomplished by the King Hussein Cancer Foundation and Center
Sep. 2008 – Humanitarian Award presented by the Institute of International Education (IIE), New York
Oct. 2007 – CCBF Breakthrough Spirit Award – presented by the Children's Cancer and Blood Foundation, N.Y.
Sep. 2006 – Dame Grand Cordon of the Order of the Star of Jordan
Oct. 1995 – Dame Grand Cordon of the Order of Independence

Foreign honours
 : Officer of the Order of Merit
 : Dame Grand Cross of the Order of Merit
 : Dame Grand Cross of the Order of Isabella the Catholic
 : Member Grand Cross of the Order of the Polar Star (15 November 2022) 

Academic awards:
1981 – 1986 – Georgetown University, Washington D.C. Distinction in Oral Comprehensive Examinations. Special Certificate for completion of combined BSFS/MSFS degree program, magna cum laude, Award for Academic Excellence. Five Years on Dean's Honors List.
1967 – 1981 – College Protestant Francais, Beirut, Lebanon Prix d’Excellence

References

External links

Mediterranean Task Force for Cancer Control
Jordan Society for Pediatric Oncology
Jordan University press release about medal of independence ceremony

1963 births
Living people
People from Beirut
Dames Grand Cross of the Order of Isabella the Catholic
Grand Cordons of the Order of Independence (Jordan)
Jordanian princesses
Walsh School of Foreign Service alumni
Salam family
Princesses by marriage